Coronicium is a genus of fungi in the Pterulaceae family. The genus has a widespread distribution in north temperate areas, and contains five species: C. alboglaucum, C. gemmiferum, C. molokaiense, C. proximum, C. thymicola.

Species 
, Species Fungorum accepted 5 species of Coronicium.

References

External links

Pterulaceae
Agaricales genera